Ignacy Hilary Halka Count Ledóchowski (13 January 1789, Krupa – 29 March 1870, Klimontów) was an Austrian as well as Polish General, a scion of the Ledóchowski family and Commander of the Modlin Fortress.

Ledóchowski was the son of Antoni Halka Count Ledóchowski (1755–1835).

References

Austrian generals
Polish generals
1789 births
1870 deaths
Ignacy